Professor Pac-Man is a quiz arcade game that was produced by Bally Midway and is the seventh title in the Pac-Man series of games, which was released in August 1983. It is also the last of only seven games from Bally Midway Manufacturing to run on their Midway Astrocade hardware. Only 400 cabinets were made; approximately 300 of these were returned to the manufacturer and converted to Pac-Land cabinets the following year.

Description
Designed to capitalize on the perceived quiz game niche, Professor Pac-Man presented simple visual puzzles, and required the players (or "pupils", as they are called by the game) to solve each within a short time limit. Despite the game's usage of Namco's popular Pac-Man character, Professor Pac-Man did not fare very well in the arcades, due to its slow pace and its abandonment of the famous maze-based gameplay that made the previous titles so popular.

Gameplay

The game is for one player or two (in a two-player game, the player who is the first to answer a question correctly receives its points) and consists of answering multiple-choice questions before the time runs out. The timer is the original Pac-Man, eating a row of pellets. The more pellets left when the players answer correctly, the higher the scores awarded. As the questions progress, Pac-Man eats the pellets more quickly. Bonus questions are awarded after a player answers between two and six questions correctly on his or her first try. The game ends when a player runs out of fruits (the game's equivalent of lives, which also serve as a difficulty indicator).  Fruits are lost for a wrong answer on a regular question (but not a bonus question), and fruits can also be earned for answering a bonus question correctly (but not lost if answered wrong).

Midway had also originally planned to release three different versions of this game: Family (appropriate for all ages, but geared towards younger players), Public (appropriate for general audiences, but geared towards arcades and bars), and Prizes (for casinos).

There were also to be new question upgrades every three months to keep people from memorizing the answers, but the game never caught on.

Although most of the questions have nothing to do with Pac-Man, certain questions (asking: "How many left/right turns to the fruit?") show the original Pac-Man maze (with a regular wall in the place of the ghost regenerator) and a line of pellets leading to a fruit in the center, and another question (which first requires the player to study a city scene) asks "Where would you go to play Prof Pac-Man?", while others require the player to fill in the blank lower-right square of a 16-square grid, with four different fruits (or Pac-Men facing different directions) in each row. On the questions which first require the player to study table settings ("Which was the correct sequence?" or "How many plates were (shape)?"), fruits would appear on the plates and Pac-Man would move from right to left as he ate them, if they were answered correctly, and for the questions which first require the player to study the light-up keys on giant telephones of various colors ("Which number was dialed?"), the receiver would come off the telephone and Pac-Man would appear to speak into it (again, if they were answered correctly).

Development
The original idea for Professor Pac-Man came from world champion foosball player Johnny Lott and Ed Adlum, the publisher of RePlay. They approached Bally Midway, only to be told that the company had no interest. A few months later, Lott, working the National AMOA Trade Show in Chicago, Illinois, noticed Professor Pac-Man cabinets on display. He threatened legal action, and Bally Midway agreed to a royalty contract. The gameplay is different than Lott-Adlum proposed design, which was much closer to a traditional videogame and featured questions being eaten by the Pac-Man character instead of pellets. It failed to create much interest in the marketplace.

Professor Pac-Man is based on a Zilog Z80 microprocessor running at 1.79 MHz and uses two banks of 512k ROM (more than any other arcade game from the time). The game was written in the Forth programming language by Rick Frankel, with graphics by Mark Steven Pierce and Sue Forner, and sound and music by Marc Canter.

Legacy
A Professor Pac-Man character appears in the Pac-Man World series. He looks similar to the character depicted in the Professor Pac-Man arcade game, except with the addition of a white mustache and a design closer to the official Pac-Man design.

References

External links

Professor Pac-Man at the Arcade History database

1983 video games
Arcade video games
Arcade-only video games
Pac-Man arcade games
Midway video games
Quiz video games
Unauthorized video games
Video games developed in the United States